Pran Central is a heritage-listed seven storey Edwardian baroque architectural style former department store, built in 1915 as Read’s Store, comprising a shopping centre with apartments above. The building is located on the corner of Chapel Street and Commercial Road in the well-known retail precinct of Prahran, a suburb in the city of Melbourne, Victoria, Australia.

The shopping centre occupies the lower ground, ground floor and first floor mezzanine, with approximately 30 specialty stores along with a food court.

History 
The 1915 seven-storey building is notable for its Edwardian baroque architecture, parapets and dual domes. The National Trust of Australia (Victoria) has listed the building as being of regional architectural, historical and social importance.

The site was initially developed in 1886 by Jacob Read as a drapery business; the Charles Moore and Company took over the business in 1903. Read had established a successful men’s clothing firm in the 1870s which had become one of Chapel Street’s largest businesses, lending its name to ‘Read’s corner’.  Moore specialised in ladies fashions, some of which were made in the shop’s workroom. Moore retained the old name but expanded the business and built the current large building in 1915 (although only the north half was completed). The building housed what was reputed to be the largest suburban department store in Australia in 1956. The lower storeys were converted into a retail facility renamed Prahran Central in 1978, including an aerobics studio/health club called Kicks on the first floor, then Pran Central after redevelopment in 1999.

Lang Walker acquired the property from Maurie Alter in 1999 for $22 million, and carried out a $60 million upgrade. The shopping centre was refurbished and the upper six floors converted from office space into luxury apartments, including two added floors under a curved roof. SJB Architects won the 2004 City of Stonnington Urban Design Award for Best Heritage Design, Alterations and Additions/Restoration for the upgrade to the Pran Central Apartments. In 2006 the shopping centre was purchased by Precision Group, from Lang Walker for $34.5 million.

Gallery

See also

Charles Moore and Co.

References

External links 
 
 

Shopping centres in Melbourne
Buildings and structures completed in 1886
1886 establishments in Australia
Buildings and structures in the City of Stonnington